William Parsons, 3rd Earl of Rosse  (17 June 1800 – 31 October 1867), was an Irish astronomer, naturalist, and engineer. He was president of the Royal Society (UK), the most important association of naturalists in the world in the nineteenth century. He built several giant telescopes.
His 72-inch telescope, built in 1845 and colloquially known as the "Leviathan of Parsonstown", was the world's largest telescope, in terms of aperture size, until the early 20th century. From April 1807 until February 1841, he was styled as Baron Oxmantown.

Life
He was born in York, England, the son of Sir Lawrence Parsons, later 2nd Earl of Rosse, and Alice Lloyd. He was educated at Trinity College Dublin and Magdalen College, Oxford, graduating with first-class honours in mathematics in 1822. He inherited an earldom and a large estate in King's County (now County Offaly) in Ireland when his father, Lawrence, 2nd Earl of Rosse, died in February 1841.

Lord Rosse married Mary Field, daughter of John Wilmer Field, on 14 April 1836. They had thirteen offspring, of which four sons survived to adulthood:

 Lawrence, 4th Earl of Rosse (known as Baron Oxmantown until 1867; 17 November 1840 – 30 August 1908).
 The Rev. Randal Parsons (26 April 1848 – 15 November 1936).
 The Hon. Richard Clere Parsons (21 February 1851 – 26 January 1923), apparently known for developing railways in South America.
 The Hon. Sir Charles Algernon Parsons (13 June 1854 – 11 February 1931), known for inventing the steam turbine.

In addition to his astronomical interests, Rosse served as a Member of Parliament (MP) for King's County from 1821 to 1834, president of the British Association in 1843–1844, an Irish representative peer after 1845, president of the Royal Society (1848–1854), and chancellor of Trinity College Dublin (1862–1867).

Scientific studies
During the 1840s, he had the Leviathan of Parsonstown built, a 72-inch (6 feet/1.83 m) telescope at Birr Castle, Parsonstown, County Offaly.  The  telescope replaced a  telescope that he had built previously.
He had to invent many of the techniques he used for constructing the Leviathan, both because its size was without precedent and because earlier telescope builders had guarded their secrets or had not published their methods. Details of the metal, casting, grinding and polishing of the 3-ton 'speculum' were presented in 1844 at the Belfast Natural History Society. Rosse's telescope was considered a marvellous technical and architectural achievement, and images of it were circulated widely within the British Commonwealth. Building of the Leviathan began in 1842 and it was first used in 1845; regular use waited another two years, due to the Great Irish Famine. It was the world's largest telescope, in terms of aperture size, until the early 20th century. Using this telescope Rosse saw and catalogued a large number of nebulae (including a number that would later be recognised as galaxies).

Lord Rosse performed astronomical studies and discovered the spiral nature of some nebulas, today known to be spiral galaxies. Rosse's telescope Leviathan was the first to reveal the spiral structure of M51, a galaxy nicknamed later as the "Whirlpool Galaxy", and his drawings of it closely resemble modern photographs.

Rosse named the Crab Nebula, based on an earlier drawing made with his older 36-inch (91 cm) telescope in which it resembled a crab. A few years later, when the 72-inch (183 cm) telescope was in service, he produced an improved drawing of a considerably different appearance, but the original name continued to be used.

A main component of Rosse's nebular research was his attempt to resolve the nebular hypothesis, which posited that planets and stars were formed by gravity acting on gaseous nebulae. Rosse himself did not believe that nebulas were truly gaseous, arguing rather that they were made of such an amount of fine stars that most telescopes could not resolve them individually (that is, he considered nebulas to be stellar in nature). In 1845 Rosse and his technicians claimed to have resolved the Orion nebula into its individual stars using the Leviathan, a claim which had considerable cosmological and even philosophical implications, as at the time there was considerable debate over whether or not the universe was "evolved" (in a pre-Darwinian sense), a concept which the nebular hypothesis supported and with which Rosse disagreed strongly. Rosse's primary opponent in this was John Herschel, who used his own instruments to claim that the Orion nebula was a "true" nebula (i.e. gaseous, not stellar), and discounted Rosse's instruments as flawed (a criticism Rosse returned about Herschel's own). Eventually, neither man (nor telescope) could establish sufficiently scientific results to resolve the question (the convincing evidence for the gaseous nature of the nebula would be developed later from William Huggins's spectroscopic evidence, though it would not immediately resolve the philosophical issues).

One of Rosse's telescope admirers was Thomas Langlois Lefroy, a fellow Irish MP, who said, "The planet Jupiter, which through an ordinary glass is no larger than a good star, is seen twice as large as the moon appears to the naked eye... But the genius displayed in all the contrivances for wielding this mighty monster even surpasses the design and execution of it. The telescope weighs sixteen tons, and yet Lord Rosse raised it single-handed off its resting place, and two men with ease raised it to any height."

Lord Rosse's son published his father's findings, including the discovery of 226 NGC objects in the publication Observations of Nebulae and Clusters of Stars Made With the Six-foot and Three-foot Reflectors at Birr Castle From the Year 1848 up to the Year 1878, Scientific Transactions of the Royal Dublin Society Vol. II, 1878.

Lord Rosse's telescopes

Lord Rosse had a variety of optical reflecting telescopes built. Rosse's telescopes used cast speculum metal ground parabolically and polished.

15-inch (38 cm)
24-inch (61 cm)
36-inch (91 cm) (aka Rosse 3-foot telescope)
72-inch (180 cm) (aka Rosse 6-foot telescope or "Leviathan of Parsonstown"), started in 1842 and completed in 1845.

See also
 List of presidents of the Royal Society

References

External links

 A list of galaxies credited to Parsons for seeing first
 William Parsons' biography written in 1868 as an obituary, published in Monthly Notices of the Royal Astronomical Society
 Website of Birr Castle, where the telescope was located, has some historical info

1800 births
1867 deaths
Parsons, William, 3rd Earl of Rosse
Alumni of Magdalen College, Oxford
Chancellors of the University of Dublin
English people of Irish descent
Parsons, William, 3rd Earl of Rosse
Irish representative peers
Knights of St Patrick
Lord-Lieutenants of King's County
Members of the Parliament of the United Kingdom for King's County constituencies (1801–1922)
Alumni of Trinity College Dublin
People from County Cork
People from York
Presidents of the Royal Society
Royal Medal winners
UK MPs 1820–1826
UK MPs 1826–1830
UK MPs 1830–1831
UK MPs 1831–1832
UK MPs 1832–1835
UK MPs who inherited peerages
People from Birr, County Offaly
Honorary members of the Saint Petersburg Academy of Sciences
Earls of Rosse (1806 creation)
Scientists from Yorkshire